Albert Joseph (Bert) Bailey (30 April 1915 – 17 June 1999), Australian politician, was a Member of the Victorian Legislative Council for Melbourne West Province representing the Labor Party from 21 June 1952 until March 1955  and then the Democratic Labor Party (or the  Australian Labor Party (Anti-Communist) as it was originally known) from March 1955 until his defeat on 20 June 1958

References

1915 births
1999 deaths
Members of the Victorian Legislative Council
Australian Labor Party members of the Parliament of Victoria
Australian Labor Party (Anti-Communist) members of the Parliament of Victoria
Victoria (Australia) state politicians
20th-century Australian politicians